Alan Kooi Simpson (born September 2, 1931) is an American politician and member of the Republican Party, who represented Wyoming in the United States Senate (1979–97). He also served as co-chair of the National Commission on Fiscal Responsibility and Reform with Democratic Party co-chair Erskine Bowles of North Carolina.

Born in Denver, Colorado, Simpson graduated from the University of Wyoming's law school (1958). Simpson served in the Wyoming House of Representatives (1965–77) and won election to the United States Senate (1978). His father, Milward Simpson, had served in the same seat (1962–67). Simpson served as the Senate Republican Whip (1985–95). After serving three terms in the Senate, Simpson declined to seek re-election in 1996.

Since leaving office, Simpson has practiced law and taught at different universities. He also served on the Continuity of Government Commission, the American Battle Monuments Commission, and the Iraq Study Group. In 2010, President Barack Obama appointed him to co-chair the National Commission on Fiscal Responsibility and Reform, which made several recommendations on ways to reduce the national debt. He has been a vocal proponent of amending the U.S. Constitution to overturn Citizens United v. FEC (2010) and allow Congress to set reasonable limits on campaign spending in U.S. elections.

Early life
Simpson was born in Denver, Colorado, the son of Milward Simpson and the former Lorna Kooi. His middle name, Kooi, comes from his maternal grandfather, whose parents were Dutch immigrants. In his youth, Simpson was a Boy Scout, and once visited Japanese American Boy Scouts who, along with their families, had been interned near Ralston, Wyoming, during World War II. There, he developed a friendship with Norm Mineta, who later became a Democratic U.S. representative from California, and the United States Secretary of Transportation in the administration of U.S. President George W. Bush. Mineta and Simpson served together in Congress, and on the Board of Regents of the Smithsonian Institution, and remained close friends.

Simpson has an older brother, Peter K. Simpson of Cody, a historian and a former administrator at the University of Wyoming in Laramie, who served in the Wyoming House of Representatives from 1981 to 1984, having represented Sheridan County, while he was then an administrator at Sheridan College. Pete Simpson was the 1986 Republican gubernatorial nominee, having sought the office while his younger brother was serving in the U.S. Senate.

One of the Simpsons' babysitters as a young boy was the future Lieutenant Governor and Education Superintendent of Louisiana, Bill Dodd, who played baseball for a time as a young man in Cody with Milward Simpson.

Simpson grew to 6'7" (201 cm) and would become the tallest Senator in the United States history until being overtaken by 6'9" (206 cm) Luther Strange in 2017, 20 years after his retirement. He would later claim to have had shrunken to 6'5" (195.5 cm) at 85.

Alan Simpson graduated from Cody High School in Cody, Wyoming in 1949 and attended Cranbrook School in Bloomfield Hills, Michigan, in 1950 for a postgraduate year. He graduated in 1954 from the University of Wyoming with a Bachelor of Science degree, and in 1958 with a Juris Doctor degree. Like his brother, he was a member of the Alpha Tau Omega fraternity at the University of Wyoming.

In 1954, he married the former Susan Ann Schroll, who was a fellow UW student from Greybull, Wyoming. He served in the United States Army in Germany from 1955 to 1956, with the 10th Infantry Regiment, Fifth Infantry Division, and with the 12th Armored Infantry Battalion, Second Armored Division.

Simpson had several run-ins with the law during his youth. An amicus brief filed before the United States Supreme Court in the juvenile imprisonment cases Graham v. Florida and Sullivan v. Florida, states:

 
Simpson stated "I was just dumb and rebellious and stupid. And a different person," adding "You're not who you are when you're 16 or 18. You're dumb and you don't care, and you think you are eternal."

Wyoming House of Representatives
Simpson served from 1965 to 1977 in the Wyoming House of Representatives from Park County.

U.S. Senate

Simpson was elected to the United States Senate on November 7, 1978, but was appointed to the post early on January 1, 1979, following the resignation of Clifford P. Hansen, who had succeeded Milward Simpson, Alan Simpson's own father, in the seat. From 1985 to 1995, Simpson was the Republican whip, Assistant Republican Leader in the Senate, having served with then Republican Leader Bob Dole of Kansas. He was chairman of the Veterans' Affairs Committee from 1981 to 1985 and again from 1995 to 1997 when Republicans regained control of the Senate. He also chaired the Immigration and Refugee Subcommittee of Judiciary; the Nuclear Regulation Subcommittee; the Social Security Subcommittee and the Committee on Aging.

Simpson was a moderate conservative. He supported abortion rights and voted against a ban of late-term abortions which did not include an exception for physical health, only for life-threatening conditions, in 1995 and 1996. However he opposed federal funding for abortions and supported the Hyde Amendment. He was also the co-sponsor of a bill regulating immigration.

Simpson voted in favor of the bill establishing Martin Luther King Jr. Day as a federal holiday and initially voted in favor of the Civil Rights Restoration Act of 1987 (but voted to sustain President Reagan's veto). Simpson voted in favor of the nominations of Robert Bork and Clarence Thomas to the U.S. Supreme Court.

After Congress
In 1995, he lost the whip's job to Trent Lott of Mississippi, and he did not seek reelection to the Senate in 1996. From 1997 to 2000, Simpson taught at the Joan Shorenstein Center on the Press, Politics, and Public Policy at Harvard University's John F. Kennedy School of Government in Cambridge, Massachusetts, and he served for two years as the Director of the Institute of Politics at the Kennedy School.

Simpson then returned to his home of Cody and practices law there with his two lawyer sons (William and Colin) in the firm of Simpson, Kepler and Edwards. The three are also partners in the firm of Burg Simpson Eldredge Hersh & Jardine of Englewood, Colorado. Colin M. Simpson, the third generation of his family in Wyoming politics, was a Republican member of the Wyoming House of Representatives who served as Speaker of the House for the 59th session of the Legislature, 2008 to March 2010. He was a candidate for governor in the primary in 2010, finishing fourth.

Simpson teaches periodically at his alma mater, the University of Wyoming at Laramie, with his brother Pete. He has completed serving as chairman of the UW capital "Campaign for Distinction," which raised $204 million. That success was celebrated by the gala event, "An Extraordinary Evening", featuring former President George H. W. Bush (who had reportedly considered Simpson for the vice presidency in 1988) and Vice President Dick Cheney, another UW alumnus, and his wife Lynne Cheney.

In 2001, Simpson became Honorary Chairman of the Republican Unity Coalition (RUC), a gay/straight alliance within the Republican Party. In that capacity, Simpson recruited former President Gerald Ford to serve on the RUC advisory board.

In 2002, Simpson was involved in the Wyoming Republican gubernatorial primary on behalf of former Democrat Eli Bebout of Riverton. Bebout won the primary but then lost the general election to the Democratic nominee Dave Freudenthal, a former United States Attorney appointed by President Bill Clinton.

Simpson was one of four speakers chosen to eulogize President George H.W. Bush at his state funeral.

Iraq Study Group
In 2006, Simpson was one of ten (five Democratic and five Republican) contributors to the Iraq Study Group Report.

National Commission on Fiscal Responsibility and Reform

Simpson was appointed in 2010 to co-chair President Obama's National Commission on Fiscal Responsibility and Reform with Erskine Bowles.

Simpson has spoken extensively about the burden being placed on future generations by the structure of current entitlement programs. In an opinion piece, "Young Americans get the shaft" published in The Washington Post on June 13, 2012, Matt Miller recounted asking Simpson (then a US senator) in 1995 how to fix this problem. Miller stated that Simpson told him "nothing would change until someone like me could walk into his office and say, 'I'm from the American Association of Young People. We have 30 million members, and we're watching you, Simpson. You [mess with] us and we'll take you out.'"

He has continued to advocate for fiscal responsibility as a board member of the Committee for a Responsible Federal Budget and a founder of the Campaign to Fix the Debt.

Campaign finance reform
Simpson has been a strong critic of the U.S. Supreme Court ruling Citizens United v. FEC, calling for an amendment to the U.S. Constitution to overturn the Supreme Court's decision in the case. In an interview with Wyoming Public Radio, Simpson said: "I think most Americans would like to see reasonable limits on campaign spending."

Issue advocacy
Simpson has been an outspoken advocate for abortion rights, stating that the matter should not be a political issue in a party that believes in "government out of our lives" and "the right to be left alone" and "the precious right of privacy". He supports LGBT rights, and equality regardless of race, color, creed, gender, or sexual orientation. In an article in The Washington Post, Simpson criticized the since-ended "Don't ask, don't tell" policy, stating "'Gay' is an artificial category that says little about a person. Our differences and prejudices pale next to our historic challenge."

Civic participation
Simpson is on the board of directors at the National Institute for Civil Discourse (NICD). The institute was created at the University of Arizona after the shooting of Congresswoman Gabby Giffords.

Simpson is an honorary board member of the humanitarian organization Wings of Hope.

Simpson is also the co-chair for the advisory board of Issue One, a nonprofit organization which seeks to reduce the role of money in politics.

In 2016, he joined the advisory board of American Promise, a national, cross-partisan organization that advocates for a 28th Amendment to the United States Constitution that would allow the U.S. Congress and states to set limits on campaign spending in U.S. elections.

Presidential Medal of Freedom 

On July 1, 2022, the White House announced that Simpson would be awarded the Presidential Medal of Freedom.

In popular culture
The June 7, 1994, edition of the now-defunct supermarket tabloid Weekly World News reported that 12 U.S. senators were aliens from other planets, including Simpson. The Associated Press ran a follow-up piece which confirmed the tongue-in-cheek participation of Senate offices in the story. Then-Senator Simpson's spokesman Charles Pelkey, when asked about Simpson's galactic origins, told the AP: "We've got only one thing to say: Klaatu barada nikto". This was a quotation from a classic science fiction film, The Day the Earth Stood Still (1951), in which an alien arrives by flying saucer in Washington, D.C.

Simpson also played himself in a cameo appearance for the 1993 film Dave.

In December 2012, Simpson filmed a "Gangnam Style" video for a campaign, with a man in a tin can costume. The video, aimed at young people, is called "The Can Kicks Back," a reference to the tendencies of members of Congress to forever "kick the can down the road" in order to avoid making difficult decisions about lowering the national debt. In the video, Simpson admonishes younger Americans to make better use of their social media than "instagramming your breakfast and tweeting your first-world problems." He advises younger people to use their social media skills and resources to rally their friends to join The Can Kicks Back. If younger Americans do not take heed, Simpson says, "These old coots will clean out the Treasury before you get there."

Works
 Right in the Old Gazoo: A Lifetime of Scrapping with the Press (William Morrow & Company, 1997)

Recognition
In 1998, Simpson received the Golden Plate Award of the American Academy of Achievement presented by Awards Council member General Colin Powell.

In 2011, Simpson and Erskine Bowles were presented the Paul H. Douglas Award for Ethics in Government for their work on the National Commission on Fiscal Responsibility and Reform.

On June 28, 2022 it was announced that Simpson would be awarded the Presidential Medal of Freedom in a July 7 ceremony at the White House.

References

Further reading
  The story of how Simpson acted as relationship counsellor for a constituent.

External links

 

 Alan K. Simpson papers at the University of Wyoming - American Heritage Center
 Fix the Debt campaign founded by Pete Peterson
 Alan K. Simpson - Nothing Else Matters Documentary produced by Wyoming PBS
Burg Simpson Eldredge Hersh & Jardine

|-

|-

|-

|-

|-

|-

|-

|-

1931 births
20th-century American politicians
American people of English descent
21st-century American politicians
American legal scholars
American people of Scottish descent
American non-fiction writers
American people of Dutch descent
Colorado Republicans
Cranbrook Educational Community alumni
Harvard Kennedy School faculty
Living people
Republican Party members of the Wyoming House of Representatives
People from Cody, Wyoming
American Episcopalians
Politicians from Denver
Republican Party United States senators from Wyoming
United States Army officers
University of Wyoming College of Law alumni
Wyoming lawyers
Military personnel from Colorado
Presidential Medal of Freedom recipients
Articles containing video clips
Members of Congress who became lobbyists